Stefan adhesion is the normal stress (force per unit area) acting between two discs when their separation is attempted. Stefan's law governs the flow of a viscous fluid between the solid parallel plates and thus the forces acting when the plates are approximated or separated.
The force  resulting at distance  between two parallel circular disks of radius , immersed in a Newtonian fluid with viscosity , at time , depends on the rate of change of separation  : 
 
Stefan adhesion is mentioned in conjunction with bioadhesion by mucus-secreting animals.  Nevertheless, most such systems violate the assumptions of the equation. In addition, these systems are much more complex when the fluid is non-Newtonian or inertial effects are relevant (high flow rate).

References 

Intermolecular forces